Meraj Airlines (Hevapimaii-ye Mi'raj) is an Iranian privately owned airline that is based at Tehran's Mehrabad Airport and Imam Khomeini International Airport.

Destinations

As of September 2022, Meraj Airlines operates to the following destinations:

Fleet

Current fleet
, the Meraj Airlines fleet consists of the following aircraft:

Former fleet
The airline previously operated the following aircraft (at August 2017):
 1 Airbus A321-200
 1 Airbus A340-300

Special livery
In 2015, Meraj Airlines painted the nose of an Airbus A320 and the fuselage of An Airbus A300 with images of an Asiatic cheetah in collaboration with the Iranian Cheetah Society to raise awareness of the endangered cat.

In 2018, they painted the body of their Airbus A300-600R with an Asiatic cheetah, for the same reason.

Services

Cabin

First Class
Introduced in 2015, sleeper seating is available on 2-class Airbus A300-600 aircraft. Each seat has massage function; a partition; a winged headrest with six-way movement; two individual reading lights and an overhead light; in-seat power supply, USB ports and an RCA socket for laptop connection; and entertainment facilities. Each seat converts to a 2-metre (6 ft 7 in) bed. Arriving passengers have the option of using Meraj's First Class arrival facilities, as well as the new Welcome Lounge at Tehran's Imam Khomeini International Airport.

Business Class
The original Business Class features angled lie flat seats with 150 degrees of recline. Passengers are also offered the use of Meraj's airport lounge facilities.

Premium Economy
Introduced on Airbus A320s, Meraj's Premium Economy is being rolled out on all short-haul aircraft. It offers Economy + seating with more space, comfort and better services.

Economy class
Passengers receive meals, as well as free drinks.

Entertainment system
Meraj airline passengers can use the main screen entertainment fitted in the cabin to watch a variety of different programs including comedy clips, documentaries and sporting events.

See also
 Iran Civil Aviation Organization
 List of Airbus A300 operators
 List of Airbus A320 operators
 List of Airbus A340 operators
 List of airlines of Iran
 Privatization in Iran
 Tourism in Iran
 Transport in Iran

References

External links

Airlines established in 2010
Airlines of Iran
Iranian brands
Iranian companies established in 2010